Nokweed Devy (or spelt Nokveed Devy, Nokueed Devy and Nokweed Davy; ; 1965 – August, 31 2016) was a Thai Muay Thai fighter,  who was famous in the 1980s and 1990s. He has fought in an estimated 312 bouts.

Biography & career
Nokweed (nicknamed Chit; ชิต) was born in a poor family in Amphoe Lang Suan, Chumphon province, but raised in Amphoe Sichon, Nakhon Si Thammarat province in south Thailand. Nokweed started Muay Thai at the age of 7 and his other two brothers are Muay Thai kickboxers, Santos Devy and Paidang Lersak Gym, all of whom are champions of the Rajadamnern Stadium.

He used to fight with many famous Thai kickboxers, such as Sagat Petchyindee, Samingnoom Sithiboonthum, Praedam Lukphrabath, Wanpadej Phukrongfah, Sangtiennoi Sor Rungroj, Mungkorndum Sitchang, and Issara Sakgreerin etc. He won three different weight championships of the Rajadamnern Stadium and also won champion of the World Muaythai Council (WMC).

Nokweed was a heavy kick fighter, he was named the heaviest kick fighter in that era. In addition, he is also the primary Thai fighter who faced foreign fighters in K-1 matches, such as Jayson Vemoa, Jérôme Le Banner, Dany Bill, Faisal Zakaria, Stéphane Nikiéma, Paul Slowinski (later became his student) and Jeff Ortzow etc. His ring name "Nokweed" means "whistle" because when he kicks it makes a whistling sound.

When he fought Jérôme Le Banner he weighted 72 kg while Jérôme weighted 107 kg, a 35 kg difference.

Retirement & death
After retirement, he became a trainer and had a Muay Thai gym with his fellow southern fighter, Lakhin Vasansit at Ko Samui, Surat Thani province.
Paidang and Nokkweed's gym was taken over by Punch it Switzerland 10 months after his death and has been run as Punch it Muaythai Gym since July 2017.

He died suddenly while training Muay Thai in the evening of August 31, 2016 at his gym, aged 51.

Titles & honours
Rajadamnern Stadium
 1984 Rajadamnern Stadium Junior Featherweight (122 lbs) Champion
 1985 Rajadamnern Stadium Featherweight (126 lbs) Champion (one defense)
 Rajadamnern Stadium Junior Lightweight (130 lbs) Champion

World Muay Thai Council
 WMC World Welterweight Champion (147 lbs)

Sports Writers Association of Thailand
 1991 Fight of the Year (vs Issara Sakgreerin)

Regional
 South Thailand Champion

Fight record

|-  bgcolor="#fbb"
| 2002 || Loss ||align=left| Quentin Chong ||  || Cape Town, South Africa || KO (Right Cross) ||  || 
|-
! style=background:white colspan=9 |
|-  bgcolor="#fbb"
| 2002 || Loss ||align=left| Faisal Zakaria || Chaweng Stadium || Ko Samui, Thailand || Decision || 5 || 3:00
|-  style="background:#fbb;"
| 2002-05-07 || Loss||align=left| Paul Slowinski || Chaweng Stadium || Ko Samui, Thailand || KO (High kick) || 4 ||
|-  style="background:#fbb;"
| 2002-04-00 || Loss ||align=left| Paul Slowinski || Kanchanaburi Stadium || Bangkok, Thailand || KO (Punches) || 2 ||

|-  bgcolor="#cfc"
| ? || Win ||align=left| David Ismalone || Chaweng Stadium || Ko Samui || Decision || 5 ||3:00 
|-
! style=background:white colspan=9 |
|-  bgcolor="#fbb"
| 1998-08-27|| Loss || align=left| Jayson Vemoa || New Zealand Vs Thailand|| Auckland, New Zealand|| Decision|| 5|| 3:00
|-  bgcolor="#cfc"
| ?|| Win || align=left| Sam Master (?) || Songchai - New Zealand || New Zealand|| TKO (High Kick) || 2||
|-  bgcolor="#c5d2ea"
| 1995-03-23 || Draw||align=left| Taro Minato || K-LEAGUE KENZAN|| Tokyo, Japan || Decision || 5 || 3:00
|-  style="background:#fbb;"
| 1995-03-03 || Loss||align=left| Jérôme Le Banner ||K-1 Grand Prix '95 Opening Battle || Tokyo, Japan || Decision (unanimous) || 5 || 3:00
|-  bgcolor="#cfc"
| 1994-12-04 || Win ||align=left| Stéphane Nikiéma || King's Birthday|| Chiang Rai City, Thailand || Decision || 5 || 3:00
|-  bgcolor="#fbb"
| 1994-09-20 || Loss||align=left| Dany Bill || Muay Thai World Championships in Honor of His Majesty the King || Bangkok, Thailand || Decision  || 5 || 3:00
|-
! style=background:white colspan=9 |
|-  bgcolor="#fbb"
| 1991-05-24 || Loss||align=left| Issara Sakgreerin || K-LEAGUE KENZAN|| Tokyo, Japan || Decision || 5 || 3:00
|-  bgcolor="#fbb"
| 1991-02-15 || Loss||align=left| Issara Sakgreerin || Muangchai Kittikasem vs Sot Chitalada||  Ayutthaya Province, Thailand || Decision || 5 || 3:00
|-  style="background:#cfc;"
| 1990-12-15|| Win||align=left| Gerald Zwane ||  || Bangkok, Thailand || KO (Reverse Elbow)|| 3 ||
|-  style="background:#fbb;"
| 1990-01-04|| Loss||align=left| Sangtiennoi Sor.Rungroj || Rajadamnern Stadium || Bangkok, Thailand || Decision || 5 || 3:00
|-  style="background:#fbb;"
| 1989-12-06|| Loss||align=left| Sangtiennoi Sor.Rungroj || Rajadamnern Stadium || Bangkok, Thailand || Decision || 5 || 3:00
|-  style="background:#cfc;"
| 1989-11-11|| Win ||align=left| Jeff Ortzow || || Phoenix, USA || TKO || 4 ||
|-  style="background:#cfc;"
| 1989-10-18|| Win||align=left| Sangtiennoi Sor.Rungroj || Rajadamnern Stadium || Bangkok, Thailand || Decision || 5 || 3:00

|-  style="background:#c5d2ea;"
| 1989-09-05|| Draw||align=left| Sagat Petchyindee || AJKF "REAL BOUT" || Tokyo, Japan || Decision || 5||3:00

|-  style="background:#cfc;"
| 1989-07-26|| Win||align=left| Mungkorndum SitChang || Rajadamnern Stadium || Bangkok, Thailand || KO (Punches) || ||

|-  style="background:#cfc;"
| 1989-03-18|| Win||align=left| Ivan Grande || AJKF  || Tokyo, Japan || TKO || 4 ||

|-  style="background:#cfc;"
| 1989-01-09|| Win||align=left| Jomhod Kiatadisak || || Phang Nga province, Thailand || KO || 1 ||

|-  style="background:#fbb;"
| 1988-03-28|| Loss||align=left| Wanpadet Phukrongfah|| Rajadamnern Stadium || Bangkok, Thailand ||Decision || 5||3:00
|-  style="background:#fbb;"
| 1987-12-31|| Loss||align=left| Sangtiennoi Sor.Rungroj ||  || Bangkok, Thailand || TKO|| 5 || 

|-  style="background:#fbb;"
| 1987-10-12|| Loss||align=left| Sangtiennoi Sor.Rungroj || Rajadamnern Stadium || Bangkok, Thailand || TKO|| 4 ||
|-  style="background:#cfc;"
| 1987-08-24|| Win||align=left| Kongdej Chor Wirat ||Rajadamnern Stadium || Bangkok, Thailand || KO|| 2 ||
|-  style="background:#cfc;"
| 1987-06-22|| Win ||align=left| Wanpadet Phukrongfah|| Rajadamnern Stadium || Bangkok, Thailand || Decision || 5 || 3:00
|-  style="background:#cfc;"
| 1987-|| Win ||align=left| Praedam Lukprabat|| Rajadamnern Stadium || Bangkok, Thailand || Decision || 5 || 3:00

|-  style="background:#cfc;"
| 1986-12-23|| Win ||align=left| Wanpadet Phukrongfah||  || Bangkok, Thailand || Decision || 5 || 3:00
|-  style="background:#cfc;"
| 1986-09-08|| Win ||align=left| Ponsaknoi Sitchang|| Rajadamnern Stadium || Bangkok, Thailand || Decision || 5 || 3:00
|-  style="background:#fbb;"
| 1986-07-23|| Loss ||align=left| Wanpadet Sakroumai || Rajadamnern Stadium || Bangkok, Thailand || Decision || 5 || 3:00 
|-
! style=background:white colspan=9 |

|-  style="text-align:center; background:#cfc;"
| 1986-05-17 || Win||align=left| Krongsak Sakkasem||  || Bangkok, Thailand || Decision ||5 ||3:00  

|-  style="background:#cfc;"
| 1986-03-25|| Win ||align=left| Sagat Petchyindee|| Lumpinee Stadium || Bangkok, Thailand || Decision || 5 || 3:00
|-  style="background:#cfc;"
| 1986-02-21|| Win ||align=left| Jomwo Chernyim|| Rajadamnern Stadium || Bangkok, Thailand || Decision || 5 || 3:00 
|-  style="background:#cfc;"
| 1986-02-03|| Win ||align=left| Jomwo Chernyim|| Rajadamnern Stadium || Bangkok, Thailand || Decision || 5 || 3:00 
|-  style="background:#cfc;"
| 1985-11-12|| Win||align=left| Prasert Jitraman || Rajadamnern Stadium || Bangkok, Thailand || Decision || 5 || 3:00

|-  style="background:#cfc;"
| 1985-07-29|| Win||align=left| Lom Isan Sor.Thanikul ||Rajadamnern Stadium || Bangkok, Thailand || TKO ||4  ||

|-  style="background:#fbb;"
| 1985-06-24|| Loss||align=left| Lom Isan Sor.Thanikul ||Rajadamnern Stadium || Bangkok, Thailand || Decision || 5 ||3:00
|-
! style=background:white colspan=9 |

|-  style="background:#cfc;"
| 1985-05-30||Win ||align=left| Lom Isan Sor.Thanikul || Rajadamnern Stadium || Bangkok, Thailand || Decision|| 5 ||3:00
|-
! style=background:white colspan=9 |

|-  style="background:#cfc;"
| 1985-02-02||Win ||align=left| Lom Isan Sor.Thanikul ||  || Hat Yai, Thailand || Decision|| 5 ||3:00  
|-
! style=background:white colspan=9 |
|-  style="background:#cfc;"
| 1985-01-25||Win ||align=left| Kulabkhao Na Nontachai || Rajadamnern Stadium || Bangkok, Thailand || Decision|| 5 ||3:00
|-  style="background:#cfc;"
| 1984-|| Win||align=left| Kengkla Sitseir ||Rajadamnern Stadium || Bangkok, Thailand || Decision || 5 || 3:00
|-  style="background:#cfc;"
| 1984-12-02|| Win ||align=left| Wanpadet Sitkrumai || || Hat Yai, Thailand || Decision || 5 || 3:00
|-  style="background:#fbb;"
| 1984-11-21|| Loss ||align=left| Lom-Isan Sor.Thanikul ||Rajadamnern Stadium || Bangkok, Thailand || Decision || 5 || 3:00
|-  style="background:#fbb;"
| 1984-10-08|| Loss ||align=left| Lom-Isan Sor.Thanikul ||Rajadamnern Stadium || Bangkok, Thailand || Decision || 5 || 3:00
|-
! style=background:white colspan=9 |
|-  style="background:#cfc;"
| 1984-09-08|| Win ||align=left| Singdaeng Kietadee || || Hat Yai, Thailand || Decision || 5 || 3:00
|-  style="background:#cfc;"
| 1984-08-23|| Win ||align=left| Samingnoom Sithiboontham || Rajadamnern Stadium || Bangkok, Thailand || Decision || 5 || 3:00
|-  style="background:#cfc;"
| 1984-07-25|| Win ||align=left| Kengkatnoi Kiatniwat ||  || Thailand || Decision || 5 || 3:00
|-  style="background:#cfc;"
| 1984-06-16|| Win||align=left| Phanmongkon Mahachai ||  || Nakhon Si Thammarat, Thailand || Decision || 5 || 3:00 
|-
! style=background:white colspan=9 |
|-  style="background:#fbb;"
| 1984-05-10|| Loss||align=left| Nikhom Phetphotong ||  ||  Thailand || Decision || 5 || 3:00

|-  style="background:#cfc;"
| 1984-04-|| Win ||align=left| Saifon Lukkabu ||  || Yala, Thailand || Decision || 5 || 3:00

|-  style="background:#cfc;"
| 1984-03-22|| Win ||align=left| Dang Lukbanphra || Rajadamnern Stadium || Bangkok, Thailand || Decision || 5 || 3:00
|-  style="background:#cfc;"
| 1984-02-11 || Win ||align=left| Ruengnarong Thairungruang||  || Nakhon Si Thammarat, Thailand || Decision|| 5 ||3:00

|-  style="background:#cfc;"
| 1984-01-28|| Win ||align=left| Daradej Kiatpraphaeng||  || Songkhla, Thailand || Decision || 5 || 3:00
|-  style="background:#fbb;"
| 1983-11-27 || Loss||align=left| Phayanoi Sor.Tasanee|| Payao Poontarat vs Rafael Orono || Pattaya, Thailand || Decision (Unanimous)|| 5 ||3:00
|-
! style=background:white colspan=9 |

|-  style="background:#cfc;"
| 1983-09-30 || Win ||align=left| Rungchai Thairungruang||  || Nakhon Si Thammarat, Thailand || Decision|| 5 ||3:00

|-  style="background:#cfc;"
| 1983-09- || Win ||align=left| Daradej Kiatpraphaeng ||  || Songkhla, Thailand || TKO || 3 ||   

|-  style="background:#cfc;"
| 1983-09-09 || Win ||align=left| Phodam Sor.Sermpong ||  ||  Thailand || Referee stoppage || 5 ||   

|-  style="background:#cfc;"
| 1983-07-23 || Win ||align=left| Wangtae Luklongtan ||  ||  Thailand || Decision || 5 || 3:00  

|-  style="background:#cfc;"
| 1983-07-18 || Win ||align=left| Jongangnoi Singkhongkha ||  ||  Thailand || Decision || 5 || 3:00  

|-  style="background:#cfc;"
| 1983-06- || Win ||align=left| Prabphipop Lukklongtan||  || Krabi, Thailand || Decision || 5 || 3:00  
|-  style="background:#cfc;"
| 1983-06-02 || Win ||align=left| Tongchai Charoenmuang||  ||  Thailand || Decision || 5 || 3:00  
|-  style="background:#cfc;"
| 1983-04-30 || Win ||align=left| Chatchai Singkhiri||  ||  Thailand || Decision || 5 || 3:00  
|-  style="background:#cfc;"
| 1983-04-29 || Win ||align=left| Muangnamnoi Dejrita||  || Hat Yai, Thailand || Decision || 5 || 3:00  
|-  style="background:#cfc;"
| 1983-04-13 || Win ||align=left| Thuk Charoenmueang ||  || Thailand || Decision || 5 || 3:00  
|-  style="background:#cfc;"
| 1983-02-13 || Win ||align=left| Pansak Sakwithi ||  || Nakhon Si Thammarat, Thailand || Decision || 5 || 3:00  
|-  style="background:#cfc;"
| 1983-01-20 || Win ||align=left| Praethong Pornniwat ||  || Thailand || Decision || 5 || 3:00  
|-  style="background:#cfc;" 
| ? || Win||align=left| Jomhod Kiatadisak ||  || Thailand || KO || 3 ||  
|-
! style=background:white colspan=9 | 
|-
| colspan=9 | Legend:

References

1965 births
2016 deaths
Nokweed Devy
Nokweed Devy
Nokweed Devy
Nokweed Devy
Featherweight kickboxers
Lightweight kickboxers
Welterweight kickboxers